Bobby-Joe Taylor (born 4 February 1995) is an English professional footballer who plays as a defender or midfielder for Dorking Wanderers.

Club career

Cambridge United
After youth spells with Chelsea and Gillingham, Taylor joined Cambridge United in 2011. On 16 February 2013, Taylor made his Cambridge debut in their 3–1 away defeat against Mansfield Town replacing Jamie Reed in the 89th minute. After a first-team breakthrough in the previous season, Taylor instead spent loan spells at Southern League Premier Division sides St Neots Town and Arlesey Town during the 2013–14 campaign, in which he made a total of 25 appearances, scoring twice.

On 30 August 2014, Taylor made his Football League debut in Cambridge's 5–0 victory over Carlisle United, replacing Ryan Donaldson with five minutes remaining.

On 11 February 2015, Taylor joined Conference South side Bishop's Stortford on a one-month loan deal. Three days later, Taylor made his Bishop's Stortford debut in their 1–1 draw with Ebbsfleet United, playing the full 90 minutes. On 7 March 2015, Taylor scored his first goal for the club in their 4–1 away victory against Wealdstone, coming off the bench to seal Bishop's Stortford's fourth of the game.

Maidstone United
Taylor joined Maidstone United on a one-year contract in June 2015. In a first season that Taylor admitted was difficult at times, the left winger played his way into first team contention at just the right time, being an unlikely deputy at right back due to an injury to Callum Driver at the back end of the season. Taylor went on to star in the club's National League South play off semi final games against Truro City, back in his more natural left wing position,  and scored a goal in the playoff final against Ebbsfleet United. The game ended 2–2 and Taylor was one of the Stones' successful penalty takers as the club beat the Fleet to the National League South promotion final trophy.

Taylor signed a further one-year contract with Maidstone in the summer of 2016 as they embarked in their first National League season since reformation. On the opening day of the 2016–17 campaign, Taylor scored his first league goal for the club in their 1–1 draw with recently relegated York City. Taylor went onto score seven more league goals, finishing the season just one behind top goalscorer; Jamar Loza. After an impressive campaign, Taylor received his first England C call-up along with teammate Kevin Lokko for their fixtures against Panjab and Jersey. On 17 May 2017, it was announced that Taylor would leave the club after failing to agree a new deal.

Aldershot Town
On 1 June 2017, preceding his release from Maidstone, Taylor joined fellow National League side Aldershot Town on a one-year deal.

He was released by Aldershot at the end of the 2017–18 season.

Dover Athletic
Taylor joined Dover Athletic on a one-month loan deal from Bromley on 25 October 2018. Taylor made his debut for "the Whites" on the 27 October in a 2–1 away defeat to fellow relegation-threatened side Braintree Town.

On 23 November 2018, Taylor permanently signed for the Kent club until the end of the 2018–19 season after a successful loan spell, during which Dover picked up only their second league win of the season.

Taylor joined Ebbsfleet United for the eventually aborted 2020–21 National League South season.

Dorking Wanderers
In May 2021, Taylor joined fellow National League South side Dorking Wanderers. Taylor made the left back position his own with his high quality deliveries and exctining runs down the left side thrilling fans at Meadowbank Stadium. On May 21st 2022 Taylor played in the National League South Playoff Final. A thrilling 3-2 wing against Ebbsfleet united saw Dorking reach the Vanarama National for the first time in their history.

Career statistics

References

External links

1995 births
Living people
People from Ashford, Kent
English footballers
Footballers from Kent
Association football midfielders
Cambridge United F.C. players
Cambridge Regional College F.C. players
St Neots Town F.C. players
Arlesey Town F.C. players
Bishop's Stortford F.C. players
Maidstone United F.C. players
Aldershot Town F.C. players
Bromley F.C. players
Dover Athletic F.C. players
Ebbsfleet United F.C. players
Dorking Wanderers F.C. players
National League (English football) players
English Football League players